Bademler is a village in İzmir Province, Turkey

Geography
Bademler is a village in Urla district of izmir Province where the capital of Urla district is actually a part of Greater İzmir. At  It is situated in the midpoint of a peninsula named after Urla. The population of village is 1435  as of 2010.

History
The village was founded in the first half of the 19th century . The Ottoman government forced the nomadic Turkmen tribes so called Tahtacı to settle down. The name of the village which means almonds refer to almond trees in the place of the village before the settlement.

Trivia
The Turkish film Dry Summer, which won the Golden Bear at the 14th Berlin International Film Festival, was shot in Bademler.

References

Villages in Urla District